Kevin Barnes (born 12 September 1975) is an English former professional footballer who played as a striker. He played four matches in the Football League Second Division for Blackpool.

References

1975 births
Living people
English footballers
Association football forwards
Blackpool F.C. players
Fleetwood Town F.C. players
Lancaster City F.C. players
Kendal Town F.C. players
English Football League players
People from Fleetwood